Great Stuff is a 1933 British comedy film directed by Leslie S. Hiscott and starring Henry Kendall, Betty Astell and Alfred Wellesley. In the film, a woman's parents became robbers in a desperate effort to prevent her marrying an unsuitable man.

It was made at Beaconsfield Studios as a quota quickie. The film's sets were designed by Norman G. Arnold.

Cast
 Henry Kendall as Archie Brown
 Betty Astell as Vera Montgomery
 Alfred Wellesley as Vernon Montgomery
 Barbara Gott as Claudette Montgomery
 Hal Walters as Spud
 Ernest Sefton as Captain
 Gladys Hamer as Cook

References

Bibliography
 Chibnall, Steve. Quota Quickies: The Birth of the British 'B' Film. British Film Institute, 2007.
 Low, Rachael. Filmmaking in 1930s Britain. George Allen & Unwin, 1985.
 Wood, Linda. British Films, 1927-1939. British Film Institute, 1986.

External links

1933 films
1933 comedy films
1930s English-language films
Films directed by Leslie S. Hiscott
British comedy films
Films shot at Beaconsfield Studios
Quota quickies
British black-and-white films
1930s British films